Dingtao District is a district under the jurisdiction of Heze in Shandong province, China. Emperor Gaozu of Han's ill-fated consort Qi was from this area.

Administrative divisions
As 2012, this County is divided to 7 towns and 4 townships.
Towns

Townships

Climate

References

County-level divisions of Shandong
Heze